The 2003 Mountain West Conference men's basketball tournament was played at the Thomas & Mack Center in Las Vegas, Nevada from March 13–15, 2003.  Colorado State upset host school University of Nevada at Las Vegas, 62–61, in the championship game to win the Mountain West Conference tournament and the league's automatic NCAA Tournament bid.

Colorado State became, and as of 2011, remains the lowest seed (6) to ever win the MWC Tournament.  They supplanted San Diego State who, just one year earlier, had won the tournament as a number 5 seed. They also had upset UNLV in the tournament championship game.

In 2004 the tournament would move to the Pepsi Center in Denver where it would stay for the next three years.  It would return in 2007, where it has remained since.

Bracket

* Overtime

Mountain West Conference men's basketball tournament
Tournament
Mountain West Conference men's basketball tournament
Mountain West Conference men's basketball tournament